Sierra, locally known as Las Minas (The Mines), is a district of the Abangares canton, in the Guanacaste province of Costa Rica. It is well known as a historical mining town of Costa Rica, located in the north west Pacific Region. It goes from an altitude of 210 meters to 1200 meters.

History and mining 
Oral history tells that the name "Sierra" is related to one of the first resources the town took advantage of: wood.
The Spanish word "sierra" means "saw." Residents developed sawmills once they knew about the valuable and precious woods in the area.

By the year 1900, the gold mining industry had started up in Abangares but mostly in Sierra, were the Abangares Gold Fields of Costa Rica (Abangares Mining Company) owned by Minor C. Keith, built up the Stamp mill House, the Company Headquarters and the Powder House. The ore activity carried vast development. By that time, people compared La Sierra development with California (as well because the Gold rush).

Climate
It is a mountainous zone with a variety of temperatures (from 34 °C to 5 °C) and climates (from dry forest to rain forest).

Geography 
Sierra has an area of  km2 and an elevation of  metres.

To the north it borders Tilarán, to the south San Juan de Abangares and Las Juntas (south west), to the east Monteverde and to the west it borders Cañas.

Economy 
The major activities are agriculture (Coffee and variety of Vegetable), Gold mining and Tourism. At the moment, gold mining is artisanal and largely unregulated.

Agriculture and mining are the most traditional activities and ways of living in the district. All over the highlands (San Rafael, Cebadilla, Campos de Oro, Cañitas, La Cruz and Tornos) small producers of coffee and vegetables are organized in cooperatives.

The Ecomuseum, the biodiversity, and the hot springs are attracting tourism from all over the world to the district. La Sierra is between Guanacaste and San José, and between Guanacaste and Monteverde. Tourism can include staying in La Sierra and using a non traditional tourist route to Guanacaste, with local options including zip lining, agritourism, visiting the Ecomuseum, seeking out local gold miners, or resting at the hot springs.

Mining ecomuseum 
The Mining ecomuseum is located on 38 hectares of local government property and managed by the district Committee of Culture and Management of Museums. It documents and celebrates one of the first mining centers in Central America, and the legends and realities that the miners of the time lived in.
The recent built showroom displays graphic and documentary information. Various paths explain the mining infrastructure, which preserves the spirit of the mining years (1901–1931).

The “Ecomuseum” idea arose in France in the 1970s. In Costa Rica it was adopted in the 1980s. The Abarenges Mine Ecomuseum was founded in 1991. It's an educational model of culture and sustainable development that integrates inhabitants with rational resource use, and ecological protection and cultural protection.

The Eco-museum was developed around the ruins of one of the oldest gold mines in the region, where old machinery, hand tools, and infrastructure can still be seen. The surrounding area is largely forested and provides opportunities for bird and butterfly watching, and other nature observation.
It is a community organization that conserves and transmits local history, and strengthens the identity of the towns. In 2001, it was declared a Historical Architectonic Patrimony.

The Ecomuseum is in an area that holds evidence of the biggest scale of gold mining in Costa Rica, where the Company “Abangares Gold Fields of Costa Rica” operated. It contains an outdoor exhibition of mining machinery, paths that lead to the ruins of an old stamp mill house, “Edificio de los Mazos,” “Casa de la Pólvora,” and great natural scenery. There is a Tunnel on a historical traverse, where Tulita, a steam locomotive, pulled ore wagons.

Villages 
Sierra is composed of fifteen villages:

 Aguas Claras
 Alto Cebadilla
 Campos de Oro
 Candelaria
 Cañitas
 Cruz
 Cuesta Yugo
 Dos de Abangares
 La Sierra
 Marsellesa
 San Antonio
 San Rafael
 Tornos
 Tres Amigos
 Turín (part)

Demographics 

Transportation

Road transportation 
The district is covered by the following road routes:
 National Route 145
 National Route 606

References 

Districts of Guanacaste Province
Populated places in Guanacaste Province